The 2016 Pekao Szczecin Open was a professional tennis tournament played on clay courts. It was the 24th edition of the tournament which was part of the 2016 ATP Challenger Tour. It took place in Szczecin, Poland between 12 and 18 September 2016.

Singles main-draw entrants

Seeds

 1 Rankings are as of August 29, 2016.

Other entrants
The following players received wildcards into the singles main draw:
  Marcel Granollers
  Casper Ruud
  Paweł Ciaś
  Michał Przysiężny

The following player received entry into the singles main draw using a protected ranking:
  Boy Westerhof

The following players received entry into the singles main draw as alternates:
  Jonathan Eysseric
  Stefano Napolitano

The following players received entry from the qualifying draw:
  Vladimir Ivanov
  Peter Torebko
  Petr Michnev
  Julian Reister

Champions

Singles

 Alessandro Giannessi def.   Dustin Brown, 6–2, 6–3.

Doubles

 Andre Begemann /  Aliaksandr Bury def.  Johan Brunström /  Andreas Siljeström, 7–6(7–2), 6–7(7–9), [10–4].

External links
Official Website

Pekao Szczecin Open
Pekao Szczecin Open
Pekao